Deineches is a genus of hoverflies from the family Syrphidae, in the order Diptera.

Species
Deineches fulva (Ferguson, 1926)
Deineches hackeri (Ferguson, 1926)
Deineches nudiventris (Macquart, 1846)

References

Diptera of Australasia
Hoverfly genera
Taxa named by Francis Walker (entomologist)
Eristalinae